Hamza Semmoumy (born 23 June 1987) is a Moroccan footballer who plays for FUS. He usually plays as defender.

References

1987 births
Living people
Moroccan footballers
Morocco international footballers
Olympic Club de Safi players
Fath Union Sport players
Botola players
People from Safi, Morocco
Association football defenders
Morocco A' international footballers
2018 African Nations Championship players